William Howitt (18 December 1792 – 3 March 1879), was a prolific English writer on history and other subjects. Howitt Primary Community School in Heanor, Derbyshire, is named after him and his wife.

Biography
Howitt was born at Heanor, Derbyshire. His parents were Quakers, and he was educated at the Friends public school at Ackworth, Yorkshire. His younger brothers were Richard and Godrey whom he helped tutor. In 1814 he published a poem on the Influence of Nature and Poetry on National Spirit. He married, in 1821, Mary Botham, who like himself was a Quaker and a poet. William and Mary Howitt collaborated throughout a long literary career, the first of their joint productions being The Forest Minstrels and other Poems (1821).

In 1831, William Howitt produced a work resulting naturally from his habits of observation and his genuine love of nature. It was a history of the changes in the face of the outside world in the different months of the year, and was entitled The Book of the Seasons, or the Calendar of Nature (1831). His Popular History of Priestcraft (1833) won him the favour of active Liberals and the office of alderman in Nottingham, where the Howitts had made their home.

They moved in 1837 to Esher, and became friends with Elizabeth Gaskell and her husband. 1838 saw publication of his Colonization and Christianity, which was later quoted approvingly by Karl Marx in Capital, Volume I. In 1840 they went to Heidelberg, primarily for the education of their children, remaining in Germany for two years. In 1841 William Howitt produced, under the pseudonym of Dr Cornelius, The Student Life of Germany, the first of a series of works on German social life and institutions. Mary Howitt devoted herself to Scandinavian literature, and between 1842 and 1863 she translated the novels of Frederika Bremer and many of the stories of Hans Christian Andersen.

In 1847 Howitt published the 'Homes and Haunts of the most Eminent British Poets' with the publisher Richard Bently. The Preface to the Second Edition dated 1847, and referring to careful revision of the work is included in the third edition, published by George Routledge & Sons in 1877, suggesting there were either two editions in 1847, or the first edition was earlier.

With her husband Mary wrote, in 1852, The Literature and Romance of Northern Europe. In June of that year William Howitt, with two of his sons, set sail for Australia, where he spent two years in the goldfields. The results of his travels appeared in A Boy's Adventures in the Wilds of Australia (1854), Land, Labour and Gold; or, Two Years in Victoria (1855) and Tallangetta, the Squatter's Home (1857).

On his return to England Howitt had settled at Highgate and resumed his indefatigable book-making. From 1856 to 1862 he was engaged on Cassell's Illustrated History of England, and from 1861 to 1864 he and his wife worked at the Ruined Abbeys and Castles of Great Britain. The Howitts had left the Society of Friends in 1847, and became interested in Spiritualism. In 1863 he published The History of the Supernatural in all Ages and Nations, and in all Churches, Christian and Pagan, demonstrating a Universal Faith. He added his own conclusions from a practical examination of the higher phenomena through a course of seven years.

From 1870 onwards Howitt spent the summers in Tyrol and the winters in Rome, where he died. In 1880 Mary Howitt had a house built for her (which is still standing) in the spa town of Meran in South Tyrol (then part of Austria) and from then on divided her time between Rome and Meran.
Mary Howitt was much affected by William's death, and in 1882 she joined the Roman Catholic Church, towards which she had been gradually moving during her connection with spiritualism. She died at Rome on 30 January 1888.

The Howitts are remembered for their untiring efforts to provide wholesome and instructive literature. Their son, Alfred William Howitt, made a name for himself by his explorations in Australia. Anna Mary Howitt was both an artist and a poet, and married Alaric Alfred Watts. Mary Howitt's autobiography was edited by her daughter, Margaret Howitt, in 1889. William Howitt wrote some fifty books, and his wife's publications, inclusive of translations, number over a hundred.

Published works
A Popular History of Priestcraft in all Ages and Nations (1833)
Calendar of Nature (1836)
The Rural Life of England (1838)
Colonization and Christianity: A Popular History of the Treatment of the Natives by the Europeans in all their Colonies (1838)
’'Visits to Remarkable Places: Old Halls, Battle Fields and Scenes Illustrative …’’ (Two series, 1840–42)
The Student-Life of Germany: By William Howitt, from the Unpublished MS. of Dr. Cornelius (1841)
The Rural and Domestic Life of Germany (1842)
The Literature and Romance of Northern Europe: Constituting a Complete History of the Literature of Sweden, Denmark, Norway, and Iceland, ... (1852)
 Land, Labour, and Gold; or, Two Years in Victoria (1855)
A Boy's Adventures in the Wilds of Australia; or, Herbert's Note-Book (1855)
The Man of the People (1860)
The History of the Supernatural in all Ages and Nations, and in all Churches, Christian and Pagan; Demonstrating a Universal Faith (1863)
The History of Discovery in Australia, Tasmania, and New Zealand (1865)
" Homes and Haunts of the most eminent British Poets" George Routledge & Sons 3rd Edition (1877)

As translator (incomplete list)
The Wonderful History of Peter Schlemihl by Adelbert von Chamisso (1844),  
The History of Magic by Joseph Ennemoser, 2 vols. (1854)  – interior images at Internet Archive; (1970 edition)
Subtitle: To which is added an Appendix of the most remarkable and best authenticated stories of Apparitions, Dreams, Second Sight, Somnambulism, Predictions, Divination, Witchcraft, Vampires, Fairies, Table-turning, and Spirit-rapping. Selected by Mary Howitt. [Editor's Preface closes "M. H."]

References

This entry contains information from the Meran Stadtarchiv and an on the spot visit to the house in Meran, which has a plaque with her initials MAH and the date 1880.

External links

1792 births
1879 deaths
19th-century English poets
19th-century male writers
English architecture writers
19th-century English historians
English nature writers
English male poets
English Quakers
English spiritualists
Nottingham City Councillors
People educated at Ackworth School
People from Heanor
Quaker writers
19th-century Australian historians
British magazine founders